Changjiang Li Autonomous County (formerly known by its Cantonese romanization name Cheongkong) is an autonomous county in Hainan, China. It is one of six counties of Hainan. Its postal code is 572700, and in 1999 its population was 225,131 people, largely made up of the Li people.

The county seat is in Shilu Town. Shilu is known for a major iron ore deposit (the Shilu Iron Ore Mine), which has been worked since the Japanese occupation of the island in the early 1940s.

Climate
Changjiang has a tropical savanna climate (Aw)

See also
 List of administrative divisions of Hainan

References

Citations

Sources 

 
 Official website (Chinese)

External links
 

 
Changjiang Li Autonomous County